The 1978 Northern Arizona Lumberjacks football team was an American football team that represented Northern Arizona University (NAU) as a member of the Big Sky Conference (Big Sky) during the 1978 NCAA Division I-AA football season. In their fourth and final year under head coach Joe Salem, the Lumberjacks compiled an 8–2 record (6–0 against conference opponents), outscored opponents by a total of 259 to 174, and won the Big Sky championship. The team played its home games at the J. Lawrence Walkup Skydome, commonly known as the Walkup Skydome, in Flagstaff, Arizona.

The team's statistical leaders included Allan Clark with 1,366 rushing yards (including 261 yards against Montana State, 250 yards against Boise State, and 245 yards against Idaho State), at the time a Northern Arizona school record. Bill Holst led the team in passing with 835 passing yards. Jerry Lumpkin led with 121 tackles.

Schedule

References

Northern Arizona
Northern Arizona Lumberjacks football seasons
Big Sky Conference football champion seasons
Northern Arizona Lumberjacks football